South of Panama may refer to:

 South of Panama (1928 film), an American silent drama film
 South of Panama (1941 film), an American action film